Donald 'Don' S S Elliot (born 1929), is a male former rower who competed for England.

Rowing career
He represented England and won a bronze medal in the eights at the 1958 British Empire and Commonwealth Games in Cardiff, Wales.

He rowed at stroke for the eights crew, which consisted entirely of members of the Thames Rowing Club and who won the final of the Empire Games Trials from the 1st and 3rd Trinity Boat Club, Cambridge.

Personal life
His son Graham Elliot was captain of the St Catherine's College Boat Club.

References

1929 births
English male rowers
Commonwealth Games medallists in rowing
Commonwealth Games bronze medallists for England
Rowers at the 1958 British Empire and Commonwealth Games
Living people
Medallists at the 1958 British Empire and Commonwealth Games